Aporia chunhaoi is a species of butterfly in the genus Aporia. It is found in northwest Yunnan. Aporia chunahoai is similar to Aporia lhamo, but it can be distinguished by its larger size, paler male hindwing, as well as different genitalia.

References 

Insects described in 2021
Fauna of Yunnan
chunhaoi